Shot in the Heart is a memoir written by Mikal Gilmore, then a senior contributing editor at Rolling Stone, about his tumultuous childhood in a dysfunctional family, and his brother Gary Gilmore's eventual execution by firing squad in 1977 for a murder he committed at a motel in Provo, Utah.

In 2001, Shot in the Heart became an HBO film directed by Agnieszka Holland, starring Giovanni Ribisi as Mikal, Elias Koteas as Gary, Sam Shepard as the brothers' looming father, and Lee Tergesen as Frank Gilmore, Jr.

The 1977 punk rock single "Gary Gilmore's Eyes" by the band The Adverts was used in the soundtrack of the movie. The song is written from "the point of view of a hospital patient who has received the eyes of Gary Gilmore in a transplant."

References

American autobiographies
American television films
Films directed by Agnieszka Holland